This is a list of transgender film and television directors.  Their works may include live action, animated, documentary, and short films; television series and movies, web series, and videos.

Transgender directors

Trans men

 Skyler Cooper
 Rhys Ernst
 Sam Feder
 StormMiguel Florez
 Yance Ford
 Jake Graf
 Silas Howard
 Sir Lex Kennedy
 Seven King
 Emmett Lundberg
 AJ Mattioli
 Elliot Page
 Campbell X
 Raven Two Feathers

Trans women

 M. J. Bassett
 Zackary Drucker
 Sydney Freeland
 Ro Haber
 ND Johnson
 Selene Kapsaski
 Nava Mau
 Janet Mock
 Kimberly Reed
 Isabel Sandoval
 Jane Schoenbrun
 Tourmaline
Wu Tsang
 Rain Valdez
 Lana Wachowski
 Lilly Wachowski

References

LGBT film directors
Lists of film directors
Lists of transgender people